Paul Johnson (born 18 July 1972) is a former professional squash player from England.

Squash career
Paul Johnson played for Greenwich in the London Youth Games when growing up and was inducted into the London Youth Games Hall of Fame in 2011. Johnson reached a career-high world ranking of World No. 4 in 1999. At the 1998 Commonwealth Games, he won a gold medal for England in Kuala Lumpur, in the men's doubles (partnering Mark Chaloner), and a bronze medal in the men's singles. Johnson and Chaloner were also men's doubles bronze medalists at the 2002 Commonwealth Games. Johnson won the British National Championship title in 1999.

Johnson was involved in a remarkable match in the first round of the British Open against Peter Nicol in 1997. In the third game, Johnson held a match-ball and appeared to win the point. The two players shook hands and walked off court, but the referee called them back and made them replay the disputed point. Nicol then went on to win the match (and ultimately reached the final).

Currently, Johnson is one of the main PSA SquashTV commentators, together with Joey Barrington. They are regarded as the humorous duo on this channel, often resorting to typical banter. Paul Johnson's favourite scoreline is 2–2 in the 5th game, accompanied by the catchphrase "There is nothing between them, Joey".

References

External links 
 Paul Johnson – PSA World Tour profile 
 

1972 births
Living people
English male squash players
Commonwealth Games gold medallists for England
Commonwealth Games bronze medallists for England
Commonwealth Games medallists in squash
Squash players at the 1998 Commonwealth Games
Squash players at the 2002 Commonwealth Games
Medallists at the 1998 Commonwealth Games
Medallists at the 2002 Commonwealth Games